The Epidemic Intelligence Service (EIS) is a program of the U.S. Centers for Disease Control and Prevention (CDC). The modern EIS is a two-year, hands-on post-doctoral training program in epidemiology, with a focus on field work.

History
Creation of the Epidemic Intelligence Service was proposed by Dr. Alexander Langmuir, chief of epidemiologic services, communicable disease center at the U.S. Public Health Service on March 30, 1951. Dr. Langmuir said that it was of utmost importance to planning of appropriate defense measures against biological warfare germs, development of new detection devices, and train laboratory workers for rapid recognition of biological warfare germs. It arose from biological warfare concerns relating to the Korean War.

The Epidemic Intelligence Service was organized on September 26, 1951, with the purpose of investigating disease outbreaks that are beyond the control of state and local health departments, enforcement of interstate quarantine regulations, and providing epidemic aid at the request of state health agencies. The Epidemic Intelligence Service's first staff members consisted of 21 medical officers from the U.S. Public Health Service.

Background
The EIS is operated by the CDC's Center for Surveillance, Epidemiology, and Laboratory Services (CSELS), in the Office of Public Health Scientific Services (OPHSS).

Persons participating in the program, known colloquially as "disease detectives", are formally called "EIS officers" (or EIS fellows) by the CDC and have been dispatched to investigate hundreds of possible epidemics created by natural and artificial causes. Since 1951, more than 3,000 EIS officers have been involved in domestic and international response efforts, including the anthrax, hantavirus, West Nile virus in the United States, and the 2014–16 Ebola epidemic in West Africa.

EIS officers begin their fellowship with a one-month training program at CDC headquarters in Atlanta, Georgia; however, 95% of their two-year term consists of experiential rather than classroom training. For the remainder of their service, EIS officers are assigned to operational branches within the CDC or at state and local health departments around the country. Placement is determined via a highly competitive matching process. The CDC pairs EIS officers with a Public Health Advisor or "PHA", forming a scientist (EIS officer) and operations (PHA) team. EIS is a common recruiting pathway into the Public Health Service Commissioned Corps.

The EIS is the prototype for Field Epidemiology Training Programs (FETP), which operate in numerous countries with technical assistance provided by the CDC.

History of responses 
Since the inception of the EIS, officers have been involved with treatment, eradication, and disease-control efforts for a variety of medically related crises. Below is an abridged timeline of their work.
 1950s: The EIS worked on polio, lead poisoning, and Asian influenza
 1960s: Cancer clusters, and smallpox
 1970s: Legionnaires' disease, Ebola, and Reye syndrome
 1980s: Toxic shock syndrome, birth defects, and HIV/AIDS
 1990s: Tobacco, West Nile virus, and contaminated water
 2000s: Post 9/11 anthrax attacks, E. coli O157:H7, SARS, H1N1, and the aftermath of Hurricane Katrina
 2010s: The aftermath of the Haiti earthquake, obesity, fungal meningitis, and Ebola
 2020s: Zika virus, COVID-19 pandemic

EIS conference
EIS officers attend an annual conference in Atlanta, Georgia, to present components of their work from the preceding year.

During the conference, the Alexander D. Langmuir Prize is awarded "to a current officer or first-year alumnus of the EIS for the best scientific publication. The award consists of a $100 cash prize, an engraved paperweight, a case of ale or beer redolent of the John Snow Pub in London, and an inscription on the permanent plaque at CDC."

A complete list of Langmuir Prize winners is included below:

In popular culture

In the 2011 film Contagion, the character Doctor Erin Mears (portrayed by Kate Winslet) is a physician and investigator with the Epidemic Intelligence Service who was tasked by the CDC to discover the origin of a highly contagious and deadly virus known as MEV-1 which was rapidly spreading throughout the world following initial outbreaks in Kowloon, Hong Kong and Minneapolis, Minnesota.

References

Further reading

  
  
  
  
  
  
 
  
 Gerard Gallagher (2017). "CDC's EIS program molds clinicians into public health professionals." (Healio.com)

External links
 

Epidemiology
Centers for Disease Control and Prevention
Epidemiology organizations
Organizations associated with the COVID-19 pandemic